The Human Development and Capability Association (HDCA) was launched in September 2004 at the Fourth Capability Conference in Pavia, Italy. It was founded to promote research from many disciplines on key problems including poverty, justice, well-being, and economics.

The Association holds annual conferences; maintains a website and mailing list; supports training activities; and provides a forum in which collaborative research can emerge.

The HDCA also produces a peer-reviewed journal, the Journal of Human Development and Capabilities: A Multi-Disciplinary Journal for People-Centered Development.  The association is supported by the Canadian International Development Research Centre (IDRC).

Presidents
The economist and nobel Laureate Amartya Sen was the founding president and remained President until 2006 when philosopher, Martha Nussbaum, took over. She was succeeded in 2008 by Frances Stewart, who specializes in development studies. Economist, Kaushik Basu became president in 2010, and was replaced by another economist, Tony Atkinson, in 2012.

The next president was the philosopher, Henry S. Richardson, he became president in September 2014 and served until 2016.  The current president, economist Ravi Kanbur, took the position in September 2016 after completing one year as president elect. Kanbur serves until September 2018.

Fellows
List of HDCA Fellows as of December 2015. 

A
 Bina Agarwal
 Sabina Alkire
 Paul Anand
 P B Anand
 Sudhir Anand
 Elizabeth S. Anderson
 Proochista Ariana
 Tony Atkinson
 Ken Arrow
B
 Kaushik Basu
 Mario Biggeri
 François Bourguignon
 Andrea Brandolini
 Harry Brighouse
 Tania Burchardt
C
 Satya Chakravarty
 Enrica Chiappero-Martinetti
 David Clark
 Joshua Cohen
 David Crocker
D
 Séverine Deneulin
 Keith Dowding
 Jean Drèze
 Jay Drydyk
 Jean Luc Dubois
 Anantha Duraiappah
F
 James E. Foster
 Sakiko Fukuda-Parr
G
 Wulf Gaertner
 Des Gasper
 Ann Goldin
H
 John Hammock
 David Hulme
I
 Solava Ibrahim
 Javier Iguiñiz
K
 Ravi Kanbur
 Stephan Klasen
 Jeni Klugman
 Jaya Krishnakumar
 Barbara Ky
L
 Ortrud Lessmann
 Luis Felipe Lopez-Calva
M
 Henk Manschot
 Guillermo Bornemann Martinez
 Mark McGillivray
 Allister McGregor
N
 Adil Najam
 Zina Nimeh
 Farhad Noorbakhsh
 Martha Nussbaum
O
 Avner Offner
 Ilse Oosterlaken
 Siddiqur R. Osmani
P
 Prasanta K. Pattanaik
 Philip Pettit
 Antonella Picchio
 Thomas Pogge
 Antoanneta Potsi
 Hilary Putnam
Q
 Mozaffar Qizilbash
R
 Sanjay Reddy
 Henry S. Richardson
 Ingrid Robeyns
 José Manuel Roche
S
 Michael J Sandel
 Erik Schokkaert
 Amartya Sen
 Randy Spence
 Frances Stewart
 Subbu Subramanian
 Robert Sugden
 Kotaro Suzumura
T
 Lorella Terzi
 Erik Thorbecke
 Graciela Tonon
 John Toye
U
 Elaine Unterhalter
V
 Martin van Hees
 Sridhar Venkatapuram
 Andrea Vigorito
 Polly Vizard
W
 Melanie Walker
 Gareth Wall
 Maria Monica Wihardja
 Jonathan Wolff
Z
 Stefano Zamagni

See also 

 Capability approach
 Demographic economics
 Economic development
 Important publications in development economics
 International Association for Feminist Economics
 International development
 Journal of Human Development and Capabilities
 Oxford Poverty and Human Development Initiative
 Sustainable development
 UN Human Development Index
 Welfare economics
 Women's education and development

References

External links 
HDCA Website
International Development Research Centre (IDRC)

Human migration
Research institutes in Massachusetts
Economics societies
Multidisciplinary research institutes